Terrence Parker is an American house DJ and music producer from Detroit, Michigan, United States.

Biography
Parker has a long career in DJing. In 2010 he celebrated his 30th music anniversary. He has been actively DJing in hundreds of cities around the world. These events range from night clubs (large and small) to music festivals with more than 100,000 people. Since 1988, Parker has released more than 100 recordings on various labels, and has had top 20 hits with his songs "Love's Got Me High", "The Question" and albums such as Detroit After Dark in the UK, The Netherlands, Germany, and France. He is nicknamed "The Telephone man" because he uses a telephone handset as headphones.

Partial discography
Tragedies of a Plastic Soul Junkie (1996)
Detroit After Dark (1997)
No Weapons Formed Against Me Shall Prosper (1997) (as Seven Grand Housing Authority)
GOD Loves Detroit (2014)
Life On The Back 9 (2017)

References

External links
 Official Terrence Parker website

African-American DJs
Living people
Club DJs
DJs from Detroit
American dance musicians
American house musicians
American electronic musicians
House musicians
Remixers
Record producers from Michigan
Electronic dance music DJs
Year of birth missing (living people)
21st-century African-American people